Dangerous Toys is a 1921 American silent film directed by Samuel R. Brodsky (as Samuel R. Bradley) and starring Frank Losee, Marion Elmore and Marguerite Clayton. One of six features directed by Brodsky, it was filmed at his Cleveland studio at the Samuel Andrews mansion on Euclid Avenue (now the studio of WEWS-TV). It is considered to be a lost film.

Cast
 Frank Losee as Hugo Harman 
 Marion Elmore as Mrs. Hugo Harman 
 Marguerite Clayton as Louise Malone 
 William Desmond as Jack Gray 
 Frances Devereaux as Mrs. Malone 
 Lillian Greene as Phyllis Harman

References

External links

1921 films
Films directed by Samuel R. Bradley
American silent feature films
American black-and-white films
Films shot in Cleveland
1920s English-language films
1920s American films